Pristimantis obmutescens is a species of frog in the family Strabomantidae. It is endemic to Colombia and known from the páramos of Cordillera Central in the Cauca and Huila Departments. Common name paramos robber frog has been coined for it. The specific name obmutescens is Latin and means "keeping silent", inferred from the lack of vocal slits or sac in males and the thick skin covering the tympanum. Despite this, the species is reported to call.

Description
Adult males measure  and adult females  in snout–vent length.
The head narrower than the body. The snout is short and rounded (or weakly subacuminate in dorsal view). The tympanum is concealed beneath the skin on the side of the head. Skin of dorsum has large, flat warts. The fingers have thick, fleshy lateral fringes and broad discs. The toes have lateral fringes and discs that are broader than long. Coloration is dark brown to yellowish-olive above. There are few brown dorsal spots, and the flanks have dark brown spots. The throat is yellow to gray-brown. The venter is gray to pale brown. The groin and posterior surfaces of the thighs are reddish-brown. The iris is brown and has copper flecks and a dark brown horizontal streak.

Habitat and conservation
It is usually found in bushy and herbaceous vegetation. It is mostly nocturnal, but males call during the day from shelters. It is a common species that is not facing major threats. Its range overlaps with the Puracé and Nevado del Huila National Natural Parks.

References

obmutescens
Amphibians of the Andes
Amphibians of Colombia
Endemic fauna of Colombia
Taxa named by John Douglas Lynch
Amphibians described in 1980
Taxonomy articles created by Polbot